Kale Çelik Eşya is a company that carries out the design, production and marketing of Kale Steel Doors, Kale Steel Safes and Kale Fire Doors is a foundation of Kale Endüstri Holding.

Production and Technology 

Kale Çelik Eşya is the pioneer of the "steel door" production in Turkey and gave its name to steel doors as Kale Steel Doors.

With the production of steel doors Kale Çelik Eşya also produces steel safes and fire doors. Kale Çelik Eşya manufactures in the facility which is established at an area of 20,000 sq m at Güngören/İstanbul with a production capacity of 20,000 steel doors per year.

Kale Çelik Eşya covers every action from project to production, sales, post-sale services and warranty coverage.

Products 

 Steel Doors
 Steel Safes
 Fire Doors
 Project Doors
 Shaft Taps
 Compact Archive Systems
 Armoured Doors

Manufacturing companies based in Istanbul